The Hallertau or Holledau is an area in Bavaria, Germany. With an area of 178 km², it is listed as the largest continuous hop-planting area in the world. According to the International Hop Growing Convention, Germany produces roughly one third of the world's hops (used as flavoring and stabilizers during beer brewing), over 80% of which are grown in the Hallertau.

Hallertau is roughly located between the cities of Ingolstadt, Kelheim, Landshut, Moosburg, Freising and Schrobenhausen. The region is defined by the hop-planting area in Bavaria.
It is divided into several seal districts:

 Abensberg
 Altmannstein
 Au in der Hallertau
 Geisenfeld
 Hohenwart
 Langquaid
 Mainburg
 Nandlstadt
 Neustadt an der Donau
 Pfaffenhofen an der Ilm
 Pfeffenhausen
 Rottenburg an der Laaber
 Siegenburg
 Wolnzach

Famous citizens 
 Johannes Aventinus (4 July 1477 – 9 January 1534), a Bavarian Renaissance humanist, historian, and philologist.
 Christoph Thomas Scheffler (December 20, 1699 –  January 25, 1756), a Bavarian painter of the rococo period.
 Roider Jackl (17 June 1906 – 8 May 1975) was a Bavarian performer, singer, and folk singer

See also 
 Hop Research Center Hüll

References

Further reading 
 Peter M. Busler: Die Hallertau: Porträt einer urbayerischen Landschaft. Pfaffenhofen 1990, .
 Christoph Pinzl: Die Hopfenregion. Hopfenanbau in der Hallertau – eine Kulturgeschichte. Deutsches Hopfenmuseum Wolnzach, Wolnzach 2002, .

External links 
 

Geography of Bavaria
Agriculture in Germany
Humulus